The .45 GAP (Glock Auto Pistol) or .45 Glock (11.43×19mm) is a pistol cartridge  designed by Ernest Durham, an engineer with CCI/Speer, at the request of firearms manufacturer Glock to provide a cartridge that would equal the power of the .45 ACP, have a stronger case head to reduce the possibility of case neck blowouts, and be shorter to fit in a more compact handgun. The .45 GAP is the first commercially introduced cartridge that has been identified with Glock.

Development
The .45 GAP has the same diameter as the .45 ACP pistol cartridge but is slightly shorter, and uses a small-pistol primer instead of the large-pistol primer most commonly used in .45 ACP ammunition. In order to provide terminal ballistics that matched the standard  .45 ACP loads, the .45 GAP was designed to operate at a higher standard pressure—roughly equivalent to the higher pressures found in .45 ACP "+P" rounds. Since the .45 GAP has a much smaller cartridge volume than the .45 ACP, the desired pressure and resulting velocity needed to be achieved through powder selection alone. Later development concluded that the .45 GAP could also fire  projectiles, as does the .45 ACP; though this pushes the .45 GAP cartridge to its limits.

Glock .45 GAP pistols
The full-size Glock 37 pistol was introduced by Glock to use the .45 GAP cartridge and was followed by the compact Glock 38 and the subcompact Glock 39. Glock's .45 GAP–sized pistols use the same frame as their 9×19mm/.40 S&W/.357 SIG line of pistols. The slide is slightly wider to accommodate the larger diameter .45 cal round and is flush with the frame. Magazines for the .45 GAP are of the same dimensions as those of the 9×19mm/.40 S&W/.357 SIG line of pistols.

Other .45 GAP firearms
Initially, due to its acceptance by law enforcement and the popularity of subcompact handguns for concealed carry, a small number of manufacturers decided to produce pistols that were chambered in .45 GAP, but they no longer produce any pistols in that caliber. Only Glock continues to manufacture pistols in the .45 GAP cartridge. Springfield Armory, Inc. did make the XD series in .45 GAP, and indeed it was the first commercially available pistol for it, but discontinued that chambering soon thereafter.

Law enforcement applications
Modern law enforcement as a whole has moved away from .45 caliber weapons in favor of firearms chambered in .40 S&W and 9×19mm. Despite this change, the .45 GAP has had a following amongst many law enforcement departments. Three state law enforcement agencies have adopted the .45 GAP as a replacement for their current issue 9×19mm Parabellum (New York) or .40 S&W service handguns (South Carolina and Florida). The New York State Police (New York Police have recently completed the transition to .45 ACP for their duty round), South Carolina Highway Patrol, and Florida Highway Patrol have all adopted the Glock 37 and .45 GAP.

The Pennsylvania State Police also carried the Glock 37 from 2007, but, due to ammunition supply problems, replaced them in 2013 with the fourth generation Glock 21 in .45 ACP. After recall issues with the new fourth generation Glocks, the Pennsylvania State Police switched to the SIG Sauer P227 in .45 ACP.

See also
 .45 Super
 .44 Magnum
 10mm Auto
 11 mm caliber
 List of firearms
 List of handgun cartridges
 List of rifle cartridges
 Table of handgun and rifle cartridges

References

External links 
 

 .45 GAP
Pistol and rifle cartridges